Gohardasht Prison is a prison in Gohardasht, a town in the northern outskirt of Karaj, approximately 20 km (12 miles) west of Tehran.

Sometimes spelled Gohar Dasht Prison, it is also known as "Rajai Shahr", Rajaishahr, Raja’i Shahr, Reja’i Shahr, Rajayi Shahr, Rajaee Shahr, Rajaei Shahr or "Rajaï Shahr Prison", etc. and sometimes as Karadj or Karaj prison (but Qezel Hesar prison is also near Karaj). In Google Maps it is listed as "Rajai-Shahr Prison, Karaj, Tehran, Iran". Political prisoners and prisoners of conscience tend to be sent to Ward 12 of Rajai Shahr. Rajai Shahr is regarded as one of Iran's harshest prisons because of its many reported cases of torture, rape and murder. IRGC has solitary confinement cells in Rajai Shahr Prison.

In the immediate aftermath of the Islamic Revolution, there were many systematic executions and interrogation of former members of the overthrown monarchy, military.

During the 1980s, members of the liberal Marxist and socialist groups (mostly university students) and supporters of The People's Mujahedin of Iran who opposed the theocratic regime were imprisoned and many of them were executed. Mass executions of political prisoners, in particular in Gohardasht and in Evin, took place during the 1988 executions of Iranian political prisoners.

Imprisoned student activist Majid Tavakoli was transferred to Gohardasht Prison in August 2010.

In June 2012, the organization Campaign to Free Political Prisoners in Iran raised a serious concern with EU Parliament representatives on the situation of political prisoners in Rajaee Shahr: ailing political prisoners are deprived from urgent medical attention, putting their life at risk.

On September 13, 2015, Iranian union activist Shahrokh Zamani died while imprisoned here.

Amnesty International spoke out against the prison's practice of blinding prisoners in eye for an eye justice in 2015.
Oct. 2016: Political prisoners protest against violations of their basic rights, causing various harms and health challenges and leading to their slow death. The quality of food has decreased recently to the point that many of the prisoners are suffering from malnutrition. On 7 October 2017, Gholam Reza Ziaei replaced Mr. Mardani as director of Gohardasht Prison.

See also

1988 executions of Iranian political prisoners
Tudeh Party of Iran: Suppression
Persecution of Baháʼís
Evin Prison
Human rights in Iran#Notable prisons
Judicial system of Iran#Prison system
White torture#Iran
Mahmoud Ahmadinejad#Human rights

References

Prisons in Iran
Human rights abuses in Iran
Buildings and structures in Tehran Province